Cariari is a district of the Pococí canton, in the Limón province of Costa Rica.

History 
Cariari was created on 2 July 1971 by Decreto Ejecutivo 1825-G. Segregated from Guápiles.

Geography 
Cariari has an area of  km² and an elevation of  metres.

The territory of Cariari is largely flat.

Seen from above, the terrain of Cariari appears on the flat side as a savannah, with the intense green of the banana trees standing out in many areas; And with large unpopulated extensions, and sites that show innumerable rivers and pipes.

The homonymous head is a rural town in expansion both commercial and agricultural level, located to about 23 kilometers to the north of the city of Guápiles and 109 km to the northeast of San José, the nation's capital.

Weather 

The climate of the district is humid and hot for most of the year; however, there are no stifling temperatures, and this is an attraction for tourism.

Demographics 

For the 2011 census, Cariari had a population of  inhabitants.

Settlements
The population centers of the district are:
 Head town: Cariari
 Neighborhoods (Barrios): San Juan, Guaria, Las Orquídeas, Los Hermanos, La Urba
 Villages (Poblados): Astúa-Pirie, Caribe, Banamola, Boca Guápiles (part), Campo Cuatro, Campo Dos, Campo Tres, Caño Chiquero, Carolina, Ceibo, Coopecariari, Cuatro Esquinas, Formosa, Frutera, Hojancha, Los Angeles, Nazaret, Palermo, Pavona, Progreso, Pueblo Triste, Sagrada Familia, Semillero, Zacatales

Transportation

Road transportation 
The district is covered by the following road routes:
 National Route 247
 National Route 249
 National Route 814

Economy 

In this region there are a large number of banana farms (80% of the Pococi canton), linked together by a vast network of roads, mostly gravel or ballast roads.

At present (as in the rest of the canton), the main economic activities are Agricultural sector: crops Extensive agriculture of banana and pineapple, the sowing of basic grains and livestock.

There are regions of great tourist interest for the beauty of the landscape, in which rural and ecological tourism could be promoted directly.

References

External links 
 Cámara del turismo del Caribe
 Sitiosdecotarica.com

Districts of Limón Province
Populated places in Limón Province